Sinocyclocheilus jiuxuensis is a species of ray-finned fish in the genus Sinocyclocheilus.

References 

jiuxuensis
Fish described in 2003